Phyllomedusa bicolor, the giant leaf frog, bicolor tree-frog, giant monkey frog, or waxy-monkey treefrog, is a species of leaf frog. It can be found in the Amazon basin of Brazil, Colombia, Bolivia, and Peru, and can also be found in the Guianan Region of Venezuela and the Guianas, and in Cerrado of the state of Maranhão in Brazil.

Description 
Males measure  and females  in snout–vent length. The dorsum is lime green whereas the belly is white to yellow-white or cream. Lower lips, chest and front legs bear sparse white spots with dark frames; these are more dense on the flanks and hind legs. Fingers are transparent brown and have large, green adhesive discs. There is a prominent gland extending from behind each eye over the tympanum. The iris is dark gray.

Distribution and habitat
It is found throughout the Amazon Rainforest of northern Bolivia, western and northern Brazil, south-eastern Colombia, eastern Peru, southern and eastern Venezuela, and the Guianas. Occasionally, it is also found in the riparian forest area of the Cerrado, a vast tropical savanna ecoregion of Brazil.

Ecology and behaviour

The giant leaf frog is a nocturnal, arboreal frog. Males call from trees in tropical humid forests. Males fight each other for mating rights by using their heads to attempt to separate another male who is attached to a female. Males fend off rivals using a series of aggressive calls and use their hind legs to push away the rival. During mating season, males may be targeted more by predators as the fights between males are very vocal and can be easily heard by predators. However, to combat this, giant leaf frogs produce peptides in their skin that serves as a chemical defense. Giant leaf frogs reproduce like most frog species through amplexus, where the male climbs onto the female's back to fertilize the eggs. The female and male construct a leaf-nest above forest pools, where the eggs are laid in a gelatinous mass of about 70 cm above the water. The eggs hatch from these nests in approximately 14 days, and the tadpoles fall into the water, where they continue the development into adult frogs. Peak reproduction occurs during the rainy season. Eggs of the giant leaf frog are heavily predated and have a predation rate of up to 61%. Species that prey on the eggs include Staphilynid beetles, phorid flies, mammals – specifically capuchin monkeys– and other predators, such as snakes. The eggs are predated because they are source of protein for predators.

Conservation
The IUCN endangered species database lists them in the "Least Concern" category, in view of their current wide distribution and large population.

Medicinal use

The skin secretion of the giant leaf frog is known as Vacina do sapo (frog vaccine)  and contains the opioid peptides deltorphin, deltorphin I, deltorphin II and dermorphin. The secretion, known as Kambo or Sapo, has seen increasing popularity in cleansing rituals, where it induces intense vomiting. There is no clinical proof that it is an effective medical treatment.

References

External links

 Erowid -> Phyllomedusa bicolor vault
 Frog secretions and hunting magic in the upper Amazon

bicolor
Fauna of the Amazon